Lygephila dorsigera is a moth of the family Erebidae first described by Francis Walker in 1865. It is found in Sri Lanka and Taiwan.

References

External links
Taxonomic and morphological studies on the Lygephila dorsigera (Walker, 1865) species-group, with description of a new species

Moths of Asia
Moths described in 1865
Toxocampinae